Queueing Systems is a peer-reviewed scientific journal covering queueing theory. It is published by Springer Science+Business Media. The current editor-in-chief is Sergey Foss. According to the Journal Citation Reports, the journal has a 2019 impact factor of 1.114.

Editors-in-chief 
N. U. Prabhu was the founding editor-in-chief when the journal was established in 1986 and remained editor until 1995. Richard F. Serfozo was editor from 1996–2004, and Onno J. Boxma from 2004–2009. Since 2009, the editor has been Sergey Foss.

Abstracting and indexing 
Queueing Systems is abstracted and indexed in DBLP, Journal Citation Reports, Mathematical Reviews, Research Papers in Economics, SCImago Journal Rank, Scopus, Science Citation Index, Zentralblatt MATH, among others.

References

External links 
 

Publications established in 1986
Springer Science+Business Media academic journals
Mathematics journals
English-language journals
Monthly journals